The 2002 Milwaukee Brewers season involved the Brewers' finishing 6th in the National League Central with a record of 56 wins and 106 losses, their only 100 loss season to date.

Offseason
January 21, 2002: Alex Ochoa was traded as part of a 3-team trade by the Colorado Rockies to the Milwaukee Brewers. The New York Mets sent Lenny Harris and Glendon Rusch to the Milwaukee Brewers. The New York Mets sent Benny Agbayani, Todd Zeile, and cash to the Colorado Rockies. The Colorado Rockies sent Craig House and Ross Gload to the New York Mets. The Milwaukee Brewers sent Jeff D'Amico, Jeromy Burnitz, Lou Collier, Mark Sweeney, and cash to the New York Mets.
February 8, 2002: Midre Cummings was signed as a free agent with the Milwaukee Brewers.

Regular season
On May 23, 2002, Shawn Green of the Los Angeles Dodgers hit four home runs in one game versus the Brewers. He also had one single and one double for a total of 19 total bases. The number broke the previous record of 18 total bases set 48 seasons prior by Joe Adcock of the Milwaukee Braves versus the Brooklyn Dodgers at Ebbets Field on July 31, 1954.

Season standings

National League Central

Record vs. opponents

All-Star Game
The 2002 Major League Baseball All-Star Game was the 73rd playing of the midsummer classic between the all-stars of the American League (AL) and National League (NL). The game was held on July 9, 2002 at Miller Park in Milwaukee, Wisconsin. The game resulted in a 7-7 tie. The next year home field advantage in the World Series would be awarded to the winning league. The game is commonly referred to as a 'flop' by sports writers due to the lack of continuation of the game.

The roster selection for the 2002 game marked the inaugural All-Star Final Vote competition (then known as "The All-Star 30th Man" competition).  Johnny Damon and Andruw Jones represented the American and National Leagues as a result of this contest.

Notable transactions
April 5, 2002: Marco Scutaro was selected off waivers by the New York Mets from the Milwaukee Brewers.
June 4, 2002: Prince Fielder was drafted by the Milwaukee Brewers in the 1st round (7th pick) of the 2002 amateur draft. Player signed June 17, 2002.
June 4, 2002: Hunter Pence was drafted by the Milwaukee Brewers in the 40th round of the 2002 amateur draft, but did not sign.
July 31, 2002: Alex Ochoa was traded by the Milwaukee Brewers with Sal Fasano to the Anaheim Angels for players to be named later and Jorge Fábregas. The Anaheim Angels sent Johnny Raburn (minors) (August 14, 2002) and Pedro Liriano (September 20, 2002) to the Milwaukee Brewers to complete the trade.

Roster

Player stats

Batting

Starters by position 
Note: Pos = Position; G = Games played; AB = At bats; H = Hits; Avg. = Batting average; HR = Home runs; RBI = Runs batted in

Other batters 
Note: G = Games played; AB = At bats; H = Hits; Avg. = Batting average; HR = Home runs; RBI = Runs batted in

Pitching

Starting pitchers 
Note: G = Games pitched; IP = Innings pitched; W = Wins; L = Losses; ERA = Earned run average; SO = Strikeouts

Other pitchers 
Note: G = Games pitched; IP = Innings pitched; W = Wins; L = Losses; ERA = Earned run average; SO = Strikeouts

Relief pitchers 
Note: G = Games pitched; W = Wins; L = Losses; SV = Saves; ERA = Earned run average; SO = Strikeouts

Awards and honors
 1B Richie Sexson, All-Star Game Selection
 SS Jose Hernandez, All-Star Game Selection

Farm system

The Brewers' farm system consisted of eight minor league affiliates in 2002. The Brewers operated a Venezuelan Summer League team as a co-op with the Boston Red Sox.

References

2002 Milwaukee Brewers team at Baseball-Reference
2002 Milwaukee Brewers team page at baseball-almanac.com

Milwaukee Brewers seasons
Milwaukee Brewers season
Milwaukee Brew